10 Firwood Fold is a 16th-century house in Bolton, Greater Manchester, England. It is a Grade I listed building and was the birthplace of English inventor Samuel Crompton in 1753.

The Crompton family lived in the house until 1758, making a living from farming and weaving, before moving to rented quarters at nearby Hall i' th' Wood.

Gallery

See also

Grade I listed buildings in Greater Manchester
Listed buildings in Bolton
15 Firwood Fold

References

Grade I listed buildings in Greater Manchester
Buildings and structures in Bolton
Tourist attractions in the Metropolitan Borough of Bolton